Minuscule 631 (in the Gregory-Aland numbering), α 1604 (von Soden), is a Greek minuscule manuscript of the New Testament, on paper. It is known as Codex Ottobonianus. Palaeographically it has been assigned to the 15th century. Formerly it was labeled by 165a.

Description 

The codex contains the text of the General epistles on 24 paper leaves (size ). It is written in one column per page, 21 lines per page.
The order of books is unusual: James, 1-2 Peter, 1 John, Jude, 2-3 John.

It has also contains the works of Ephrem the Syrian and other Church Fathers. The whole manuscript has 339 leaves.

 The whole codex contents
 folios 17-48 — Pauline epistles
 folios 49-72 — General epistles
 folios 73-339 — works of Ephrem and other Church Fathers

Text 

The Greek text of the codex was not placed by Kurt Aland in any Category.

History 

Scrivener dated the manuscript to the 14th century, Gregory dated it to the 16th century. Actually it is dated by the INTF to the 15th century.

The manuscript was added to the list of New Testament manuscripts by Johann Martin Augustin Scholz, who slightly examined the manuscript. It was examined and described by Giuseppe Cozza-Luzi.  C. R. Gregory saw the manuscript in 1886.

Formerly it was labeled by 165a. In 1908 Gregory gave the number 631 to it.

The manuscript currently is housed at the Vatican Library (Ottob. gr. 417, fol. 49-72), at Rome.

See also 

 List of New Testament minuscules
 Biblical manuscript
 Textual criticism

References

Further reading 

 

Greek New Testament minuscules
12th-century biblical manuscripts
Manuscripts of the Vatican Library